In architecture, a mascaron ornament is a face, usually human, sometimes frightening or chimeric whose alleged function was originally to frighten away evil spirits so that they would not enter the building. The concept was subsequently adapted to become a purely decorative element. The most recent architectural styles to extensively employ mascarons were Beaux Arts and Art Nouveau. In addition to architecture, mascarons are used in the other applied arts.

Gallery

See also
Chimera (architecture)
Gargoyle
Green Man
Mask

References

External links

Art of Old Paris